Pyrausta heliothidia is a moth in the family Crambidae. It is found in Peru.

References

Moths described in 1913
heliothidia
Moths of South America